The CWI/WIPA Awards are a set of annual cricket awards given jointly by the Cricket West Indies (CWI) and the West Indies Players' Association (WIPA). The awards recognise and honour the best West Indian international and domestic cricketers of the past season. The awards were known as WIPA Awards until 2013 when the CWI, then known as West Indies Cricket Board (WICB), and WIPA decided to jointly host the awards function.

History
The West Indies Players' Association (WIPA) started the WIPA Awards in 2004, with First Citizens Bank as its title sponsor. The awards were called "First Citizens WIPA Awards" for the first nine years, after which WIPA and the West Indies Cricket Board (WICB) agreed to jointly organize and fund the awards with the function being renamed as "WICB/WIPA Awards". After West Indies Cricket Board was renamed as Cricket West Indies, the awards have come to be known as "CWI/WIPA Awards".

The winners of the awards are selected by a panel of judges which mainly consists of eminent former cricketers from the West Indies. The panel of judges for the inaugural awards in 2004 included Ian Bishop, Joey Carew, Tony Cozier, Gordon Greenidge, Gus Logie, Vivian Richards and Ricky Skerritt.

Brian Lara won the first ever WIPA Player of the Year Award in 2004 and went on to win it the following two years as well to complete a hat-trick. Apart from Lara, three cricketers have won the award more than once: Shivnarine Chanderpaul (2008 and 2009), Chris Gayle (2007 and 2011) and Marlon Samuels (2013 and 2016). Chanderpaul has won the Test Player of the Year award four times (2008, 2009, 2013 and 2014), the most by any player, while the ODI Player of the Year has been won twice each by Chanderpaul, Gayle and Samuels. The T20I Player of the Year award was introduced in 2010 and only Sunil Narine has won it more than once (in 2013 and 2014).

The only award in women's cricket, Women's Player of the Year, has been won by Stafanie Taylor for a record nine times, including eight wins in succession from 2009 to 2016.

List of winners

WIPA Awards

2004

The awards function was held on 17 March 2004 in Port of Spain, Trinidad and Tobago.
 Player of the Year: Brian Lara
 Regional Four Day Player of the Year: Tino Best
 Under-19 Player of the Year: Ravi Rampaul

2005
The awards function was held on 31 May 2005 in Kingston, Jamaica.
 Player of the Year: Brian Lara
 Test Player of the Year: Brian Lara
 ODI Player of the Year: Chris Gayle
 Emerging Player of the Year: Dwayne Bravo
 Regional Four Day Team of the Year: Barbados
 Under-19 Team of the Year: Jamaica
 Regional Four Day Player of the Year: Devon Smith
 Under-19 Player of the Year: Xavier Marshall

2006
The awards function was held on 24 May 2006 in Port of Spain, Trinidad and Tobago.
 Player of the Year: Brian Lara
 Test Player of the Year: Brian Lara
 ODI Player of the Year: Ian Bradshaw
 Emerging Player of the Year: Denesh Ramdin
 Women's Player of the Year: Pamela Lavine
 Regional Four Day Team of the Year: Guyana
 Under-19 Team of the Year: Trinidad and Tobago
 Under-15 Team of the Year: Trinidad and Tobago
 Regional Four Day Player of the Year: Ridley Jacobs
 Regional 50-over Player of the Year: Ramnaresh Sarwan
 Under-19 Player of the Year: Sunil Narine
 Under-15 Player of the Year: Adrian Barath

2007
The awards function was held on 12 February 2007 in Bridgetown, Barbados.
 Player of the Year: Chris Gayle
 Test Player of the Year: Daren Ganga
 ODI Player of the Year: Ramnaresh Sarwan
 Emerging Player of the Year: Jerome Taylor
 Women's Player of the Year: Stafanie Taylor
 Regional Four Day Team of the Year: Trinidad and Tobago
 Under-19 Team of the Year: Guyana
 Regional Four Day Player of the Year: Ryan Hinds
 Regional 50-over Player of the Year: Kieron Pollard
 Under-19 Player of the Year: Veerasammy Permaul

2008

The awards function was held on 30 March 2008 in Port of Spain, Trinidad and Tobago.
 Player of the Year: Shivnarine Chanderpaul
 Test Player of the Year: Shivnarine Chanderpaul
 ODI Player of the Year: Shivnarine Chanderpaul
 Emerging Player of the Year: Adrian Barath
 Women's Player of the Year: Stacy-Ann King
 Regional Four Day Team of the Year: Trinidad and Tobago
 Under-19 Team of the Year: Guyana
 Regional Four Day Player of the Year: Daren Ganga
 Regional 50-over Player of the Year: Shawn Findlay
 Under-19 Player of the Year: Shamarh Brooks

2009
The awards function was held on 12 March 2009 in Port of Spain, Trinidad and Tobago.
 Player of the Year: Shivnarine Chanderpaul
 Test Player of the Year: Shivnarine Chanderpaul
 ODI Player of the Year: Chris Gayle
 Emerging Player of the Year: Brendan Nash
 Women's Player of the Year: Stafanie Taylor
 Regional Four Day Team of the Year: Jamaica
 Under-19 Team of the Year: Barbados
 Regional Four Day Player of the Year: Nikita Miller
 Regional 50-over Player of the Year: Kieron Pollard
 Caribbean Twenty20 Player of the Year: Dave Mohammed
 Under-19 Player of the Year: Keron Cottoy

2010
The awards function was held on 8 June 2010 in Port of Spain, Trinidad and Tobago.
 Player of the Year: Ramnaresh Sarwan
 Test Player of the Year: Ramnaresh Sarwan
 ODI Player of the Year: Shivnarine Chanderpaul
 T20I Player of the Year: Dwayne Bravo
 Emerging Player of the Year: Kemar Roach
 Women's Player of the Year: Stafanie Taylor
 Regional Four Day Team of the Year: Trinidad and Tobago
 Under-19 Team of the Year: Jamaica
 Regional Four Day Player of the Year: Narsingh Deonarine
 Regional 50-over Player of the Year: Daren Ganga
 Caribbean Twenty20 Player of the Year: Darren Bravo
 Under-19 Player of the Year: Akeem Dewar

2011

The awards function was held on 5 June 2011 in Port of Spain, Trinidad and Tobago.
 Player of the Year: Chris Gayle
 Test Player of the Year: Chris Gayle
 ODI Player of the Year: Kieron Pollard
 T20I Player of the Year: Darren Sammy
 Emerging Player of the Year: Darren Bravo
 Women's Player of the Year: Stafanie Taylor
 Regional Four Day Team of the Year: Jamaica
 Under-19 Team of the Year: Windward Islands
 Regional Four Day Player of the Year: Imran Khan
 Regional 50-over Player of the Year: Kirk Edwards
 Caribbean Twenty20 Player of the Year: Devendra Bishoo
 Under-19 Player of the Year: Keiron Joseph

2012
The awards function was held on 13 April 2012 in Port of Spain, Trinidad and Tobago.
 Player of the Year: Devendra Bishoo
 Test Player of the Year: Devendra Bishoo
 ODI Player of the Year: Andre Russell
 T20I Player of the Year: Lendl Simmons
 Emerging Player of the Year: Kirk Edwards
 Women's Player of the Year: Stafanie Taylor
 Regional Four Day Team of the Year: Jamaica
 Under-19 Team of the Year: Jamaica
 Regional Four Day Player of the Year: Marlon Samuels
 Regional 50-over Player of the Year: Sunil Narine
 Caribbean Twenty20 Player of the Year: Lendl Simmons
 Under-19 Player of the Year: Derone Davis

WICB/WIPA Awards

2013
The awards function was held on 4 July 2013 in Port of Spain, Trinidad and Tobago.
 Player of the Year: Marlon Samuels
 Test Player of the Year: Shivnarine Chanderpaul
 ODI Player of the Year: Marlon Samuels
 T20I Player of the Year: Sunil Narine
 Emerging Player of the Year: Kieran Powell
 Women's Player of the Year: Stafanie Taylor
 WICB Lifetime Achievement Award: John Hendricks
 WIPA Lifetime Achievement Award: Winston Reid
 Regional Four Day Team of the Year: Jamaica
 Under-19 Team of the Year: Barbados
 Regional Four Day Player of the Year: Nikita Miller
 Regional 50-over Player of the Year: Sunil Narine
 Caribbean Twenty20 Player of the Year: Krishmar Santokie
 Under-19 Player of the Year: Jeremy Solozano

2014
The awards function was held on 5 June 2014 in Kingston, Jamaica.
 Player of the Year: Darren Bravo
 Test Player of the Year: Shivnarine Chanderpaul
 ODI Player of the Year: Dwayne Bravo
 T20I Player of the Year: Sunil Narine
 Emerging Player of the Year: Miguel Cummins
 Women's Player of the Year: Stafanie Taylor
 WICB Lifetime Achievement Award: Teddy Griffith
 WIPA Lifetime Achievement Award: Lockhart Sebastien
 Regional Four Day Team of the Year: Trinidad and Tobago
 Under-19 Team of the Year: Jamaica
 Regional Four Day Player of the Year: Nikita Miller
 Regional 50-over Player of the Year: Shane Shillingford
 Twenty20 Player of the Year: Darren Bravo
 Under-19 Player of the Year: Tagenarine Chanderpaul

2015
The awards function was held on 9 June 2015 in Kingston, Jamaica.
 Player of the Year: Sulieman Benn
 Test Player of the Year: Kraigg Brathwaite
 ODI Player of the Year: Denesh Ramdin
 T20I Player of the Year: Samuel Badree
 Emerging Player of the Year: Jermaine Blackwood
 Women's Player of the Year: Stafanie Taylor
 WICB Lifetime Achievement Award: Chetram Singh
 WIPA Lifetime Achievement Award: Renford Pinnock
 Regional Four Day Team of the Year: Barbados
 Under-19 Team of the Year: Guyana
 Regional Four Day Player of the Year: Shacaya Thomas
 Regional 50-over Player of the Year: Dwayne Smith
 Twenty20 Player of the Year: Lendl Simmons
 Under-19 Player of the Year: Shimron Hetmyer

2016

The awards function was held on 19 July 2016 in St. John's, Antigua and Barbuda.
 Player of the Year: Marlon Samuels
 Test Player of the Year: Darren Bravo
 ODI Player of the Year: Marlon Samuels
 T20I Player of the Year: Chris Gayle
 Emerging Player of the Year: Jomel Warrican
 Women's Player of the Year: Stafanie Taylor
 WICB Lifetime Achievement Award: Clarvis Joseph
 WIPA Lifetime Achievement Award: Ralston Otto
 Regional Four Day Team of the Year: Guyana
 Under-19 Team of the Year: Guyana
 Regional Four Day Player of the Year: Veerasammy Permaul
 Regional 50-over Player of the Year: Jason Mohammed
 Twenty20 Player of the Year: Dwayne Bravo
 Under-19 Player of the Year: Shimron Hetmyer

CWI/WIPA Awards

2017
The awards function was held on 7 July 2017 in Kingston, Jamaica.
 Player of the Year: Roston Chase
 Test Player of the Year: Roston Chase
 ODI Player of the Year: Jason Holder
 T20I Player of the Year: Andre Russell
 Emerging Player of the Year: Roston Chase
 Women's Player of the Year: Stafanie Taylor
 Women's ODI Player of the Year: Stafanie Taylor
 Women's T20I Player of the Year: Stafanie Taylor
 CWI Lifetime Achievement Award: Walter Eden St John
 WIPA Lifetime Achievement Award: Cleveland Davidson
 Regional Four Day Team of the Year: Guyana
 Under-19 Team of the Year: Guyana
 Regional Four Day Player of the Year: Roston Chase
 Regional 50-over Player of the Year: Ashley Nurse
 Twenty20 Player of the Year: Dwayne Bravo
 Under-19 Player of the Year: Joshua Bishop
 WIPA in the Community award: Kameah Cooper
 Windies Foundation Award: The Chris Gayle Foundation

2018
The awards function was held on 20 June 2018 in Bridgetown, Barbados.
 Player of the Year: Shai Hope
 Test Player of the Year: Shai Hope
 ODI Player of the Year: Shai Hope
 T20I Player of the Year: Evin Lewis
 Emerging Player of the Year: Keemo Paul
 Women's Player of the Year: Stafanie Taylor
 Women's ODI Player of the Year: Stafanie Taylor
 Women's T20I Player of the Year: Deandra Dottin
 CWI Lifetime Achievement Award: Carol Whilby-Maxwell
 WIPA Lifetime Achievement Award: Dawnley Joseph
 Regional Four Day Team of the Year: Guyana
 Under-19 Team of the Year: Guyana
 Regional Four Day Player of the Year: Devon Smith
 Regional 50-over Player of the Year: Roston Chase
 Twenty20 Player of the Year: Chadwick Walton
 Under-19 Player of the Year: Kirstan Kallicharan
 WIPA in the Community award: Rodney Sieunarine
 Windies Foundation Award: The Marlon Samuels Foundation
 Umpire of the Year: Joel Wilson

References

External links
 Players' Awards at West Indies Players' Association

Cricket awards and rankings
West Indian cricket lists
2004 establishments in North America
Awards established in 2004